This list contains lists of curling clubs worldwide:

North America

Canada - Lists of curling clubs in Canada
List of curling clubs in Alberta
List of curling clubs in British Columbia
List of curling clubs in Manitoba
List of curling clubs in New Brunswick
List of curling clubs in Newfoundland and Labrador
List of curling clubs in Nova Scotia
List of curling clubs in Ontario
List of curling clubs in Prince Edward Island
List of curling clubs in Quebec
List of curling clubs in Saskatchewan
List of curling clubs in the Yukon, the Northwest Territories and Nunavut
List of curling clubs in the United States

Asia
List of curling clubs in China
List of curling clubs in Japan
List of curling clubs in South Korea

Europe
List of curling clubs in Czech Republic
List of curling clubs in Denmark
List of curling clubs in Finland
List of curling clubs in France
List of curling clubs in Germany
List of curling clubs in Italy
List of curling clubs in Lithuania
List of curling clubs in the Netherlands
List of curling clubs in Norway
List of curling clubs in Poland
List of curling clubs in Russia
List of curling clubs in Scotland
List of curling clubs in Sweden
List of curling clubs in Switzerland

Oceania
List of curling clubs in Australia
List of curling clubs in New Zealand

See also

References